Çiçek Island (literally Island of flower) is an Aegean island of Turkey.

The ancient name of the island was Angistri or Argyronesos. According to Milliyet newspaper currently the island is put on market.

References

Aegean islands
Islands of Turkey
Islands of Balıkesir Province
Ayvalık